The 2018–19 Croatian Women's First Football League (Prva hrvatska nogometna liga za žene) was the twenty eight season of Croatian Women's First Football League, the national championship for women's association football teams in Croatia, since its establishment in 1992. The season started on 22 September 2018 and ended on 2 June 2019.

The league was contested by ten teams and played in a double round robin format, with each team playing every other team two times over 18 rounds. ŽNK Osijek were the defending champions, having won their twenty second title in 2017–18.

Teams

The following is a complete list of teams who are contesting the 2018–19 Croatian Women's First Football League.

League table

Results

Top scorers
Updated to matches played on 2 June 2019.

References

External links
Croatian Women's First Football League at UEFA.com
Croatian Women's First Football League at Croatian Football Federation website

Croatian Women's First Football League seasons
Croatia
women
Football
Football